The 2022 GT World Challenge Europe Endurance Cup is the twelfth season of the GT World Challenge Europe Endurance Cup since its inception in 2011 as the Blancpain Endurance Series.

The season began on 1 April at Imola and will end on 2 October at Circuit de Barcelona-Catalunya. In a change from the 2021 schedule, the round at the Nürburgring was moved to the Hockenheimring. On 29 October 2021, a second change to the schedule was announced, moving the opening round from Monza to Imola and staging the event one week earlier.

Calendar

Entry list

Race results

Championship standings 
Scoring system
Championship points are awarded for the first ten positions in each race. The pole-sitter also receives one point and entries are required to complete 75% of the winning car's race distance in order to be classified and earn points. Individual drivers are required to participate for a minimum of 25 minutes in order to earn championship points in any race.

Imola, Hockenheim & Barcelona points

Paul Ricard points

24 Hours of Spa points
Points are awarded after six hours, after twelve hours and at the finish.

Drivers' Championship

Overall 

Notes:
  – Entry did not finish the race but was classified, as it completed more than 75% of the race distance.

Silver Cup

Gold Cup

Pro-Am Cup

Team's championships

Overall

Silver Cup

Gold Cup

Pro-Am Cup

See also 
 2022 British GT Championship
 2022 GT World Challenge Europe
 2022 GT World Challenge Europe Sprint Cup
 2022 GT World Challenge Asia
 2022 GT World Challenge America
 2022 GT World Challenge Australia
 2022 Intercontinental GT Challenge
 SRO GT Anniversary

Notes

References

External links
 

GT World Challenge Europe Endurance Cup
GT World Challenge Europe Endurance Cup
2022 GT World Challenge Europe